Dog Law is a 1928 American silent action film directed by Jerome Storm and starring Jules Cowles and Mary Mayberry.

Cast
 Ranger the Dog as Ranger 
 Robert Sweeney as Jim Benson 
 Jules Cowles as Hawkins 
 Walter Maly as McAllister 
 Mary Mayberry as Jean Lawson

References

Bibliography
 Munden, Kenneth White. The American Film Institute Catalog of Motion Pictures Produced in the United States, Part 1. University of California Press, 1997.

External links
 

1928 films
1920s action films
American silent feature films
American action films
American black-and-white films
Films directed by Jerome Storm
Film Booking Offices of America films
1920s English-language films
1920s American films